Ziemięcin may refer to the following places:
Ziemięcin, Greater Poland Voivodeship (west-central Poland)
Ziemięcin, Łódź Voivodeship (central Poland)
Ziemięcin, Masovian Voivodeship (east-central Poland)